Evelyn O'Neill is an American talent manager and film producer. She is best known for producing the critically acclaimed film Lady Bird, for which she was co-nominated for the Academy Award for Best Picture at the 90th Academy Awards. She is also a founding partner of Management 360 and the talent manager for Julianne Moore, Chadwick Boseman, Salma Hayek, Daniel Kaluuya, Bryce Dallas Howard, and Greta Gerwig.

Career
O'Neill graduated cum laude from Harvard University and went on to the Master's program in Film History, Theory and Criticism at the University of California, Los Angeles, She started her career in the late 1980s as an assistant to Suzan Bymel, with whom she founded the agency  Bymel O'Neill & Associates in 1994.

In 2002, O'Neill and Bymel, together with Eric Kranzler, David Seltzer, Guymon Casady and Daniel Rappaport founded the Management 360 talent and literary management company. In 2009, The Hollywood Reporter named her the 90 in their #100 Most Influential Women in the Entertainment Industry.

In 2017, O'Neill produced Lady Bird, with her Management 360 client and actress turned director Greta Gerwig with Scott Rudin and Eli Bush. The film earned many nominations and awards including Academy Award for Best Picture

Filmography
 2017: Lady Bird (producer) 
 2006: Faceless (TV Movie) (executive producer) 
 2005: Trust the Man (executive producer) 
 2000: Talk to Me (TV Series) (producer - 6 episodes) 
 1998: House Rules (TV Series) (producer - 7 episodes)

References

External links
 

Living people
American film producers
American women film producers
University of California, Los Angeles alumni
Harvard University alumni
Year of birth missing (living people)
21st-century American women